Dr Margaret Roach 'Killie' Campbell (1881- 1965) was a South African collector of Africana. Her collection was bequeathed to the University of Natal and is now the Killie Campbell Africana Library.  Campbell was the second daughter of Natal politician and sugar magnate, Sir Marshall Campbell.

Education
She was educated at St. Anne's Diocesan College in Hilton, KwaZulu-Natal and at St. Leonard's School in Scotland.

Work 
In 1939 Killie stated that, "My Africana collection comprises chiefly old travel books, books on history, biographies, and reminiscences." When describing her Africana collection in an article published in Africana notes and news in September 1945 she wrote, "This Library has approximately 20,000 books, and I have specialized chiefly in history and Bantu life."

Honours and legacy
Campbell was awarded honorary degrees from the University of Natal in 1950 and the University of the Witwatersrand in 1954. She was awarded an honorary fellowship of the South African Library Association in 1958. The City of Durban awarded her civic honours in 1964.

References

External links
Killie Campbell Africana Library , attached to the campus of the University of KwaZulu–Natal
A Tribute to Killie Campbell - by Barbara Tyrrell - Circa 1969

1881 births
1965 deaths
South African collectors
20th-century  South African historians